Stolen Moments is the final studio album by American jazz saxophonist, composer and arranger Oliver Nelson, featuring performances recorded in 1975 for the East Wind label.

Reception

The Allmusic site awarded the album 3½ stars, calling it: "A fine finish to a much-too-brief life".

Track listing
All compositions by Oliver Nelson except as indicated
 "Stolen Moments" - 7:46
 "St. Thomas" (Sonny Rollins) - 3:57
 "Three Seconds" - 6:27
 "Mission Accomplished" - 6:30
 "Midnight Blue" (Neal Hefti) - 4:10
 "Yearnin'" - 6:23
 "Straight, No Chaser" (Thelonious Monk) - 0:38

Personnel
Oliver Nelson - alto saxophone, arranger, conductor
Bobby Bryant - trumpet, flugelhorn 
Jerome Richardson - soprano saxophone, piccolo, flute
Bobby Bryant Jr., Buddy Collette - tenor saxophone, flute
Jack Nimitz - baritone saxophone
Mike Wofford - electric piano, piano 
Chuck Domanico - electric bass
Shelly Manne - drums

References

1975 albums
Albums arranged by Oliver Nelson
Albums conducted by Oliver Nelson
East Wind Records albums
Oliver Nelson albums